Covenant University Library, also known as Centre for Learning Resources (CLR), is the library of Covenant University in Ota, Ogun State, Nigeria. It is housed in a three-story glass building with a seating capacity of 3,500.

Location 
The library is located amidst the college buildings, the chapel and the halls of residence.

History 
The history of the library dates to the opening of the university in 2002. The library occupied the ground floor of a wing of the College of Business and Social Sciences until 2004 when the library building was completed. The building has three floors with a space of 11,300 square metres with a seating capacity of 3,500. It is an imposing glass structure, which portrays learning and research as the major activities in the University. The library's operations were automated using in-house software from 2002 to 2004. This software became inadequate when the collections of CLR exceeded 10,000 volumes, when the Library migrated to 'Alice for Windows' software in 2004. In 2011 the library implemented Millennium ILS software from Innovative Interfaces, which provided a web interface with access to the catalogues of other libraries.

The library serves over 8,079 students and 458 faculty members. It is the second university library in Nigeria to develop an institutional repository using EPrints, an open-source self-archiving software. The repository has consistently ranked the best in West Africa by the in the Webometrics Ranking of World Universities.

Collections 
, the library's collection includes 131,465 printed volumes and 774,000 electronic books. It also has over 50,000 electronic journals and 2,498 hard copies across all disciplines. Regularly updated electronic databases facilitate access to the library's collections. Bibliographic details of the library collections are held in a digitized format which is accessible on computer terminals in the library and remotely using Millennium ILS Software.

Sections and services 

 Wireless Access Points: there is wireless access in all sections of the library that enable students and staff to use their laptops in accessing the internet or other networked resources of the University.
 Media Centre: this provides users with access to laptops connected to the Internet. The centre also has a section with a wireless hub reserved for researchers.
 Reprographic and Bindery Services: this carries out binding and repair of worn-out books. The bindery section is likewise responsible for the collation, bindery and return of students’ projects. The reprographic unit provides printing and photocopying services to all users. 
 Circulation Services: The Circulation module of Innovative Millennium Software is used for Charging and Discharging of resources to library patrons using the barcode scanning machines.
 Institutional Repository: There is continuous digitization of Covenant University intellectual output such as documents, theses, conference proceedings, journal articles, newspapers, past question papers and other publications of useful archival value with a view to creating a robust Institutional Repository.
 CLR WebPAC: The Web Public Access Catalogue as a bibliographic control measure, is a catalogue which provides access to the rich collection of the library from 13 workstations within the readers’ services section situated at the first and the second floor of the library.
 Serials: This section is situated on the ground floor, occupying a space of about 4564m2. It stocks newspapers, magazines, seminar proceedings and journals on various subjects for the information needs of the university community. Physical or hard copies of journals of 791 titles with numerous volumes, including local and foreign, organised on steel display racks and over 40,000 electronic journals across various disciplines accessible from the university online databases. The serials section subscribes to seven daily and two weekly newspapers, four local and five foreign magazines. It operates open access to its collections.
 Online Reference Services: The reference section is located on the ground floor of the bravura library building. It offers reference information services across various disciplines for both students and faculty. The reference section deploys Selective Dissemination of Information (SDI), a platform for rendering online reference services using electronic mail. It also serves as an avenue for answering users’ inquiries individually or collectively.

Additional services 
Escapist reading: this section provides educational video documentaries that combine leisure, recreation and learning.

Spiritual and Leadership Development: the resources comprise literature on leadership and spiritual growth, in print, audio and audio-visual formats.

Monthly seminars: the library holds monthly seminars to discuss research findings and current trends in Library and Information Science. These seminars offer primary and secondary school teachers and students information literacy skills development for both digital and analogue learning environments.

Liaison librarians: librarians are assigned to liaise with the university's four colleges and the School of Postgraduate Studies.

Community services and outreach: the Library Community Development Committee is responsible for reaching out to the less privileged with information and learning resources; all academic librarians belong to the Committee.

See also 
 Academic libraries in Nigeria

References

Further reading 
 

Academic libraries in Nigeria
Covenant University